Tangará is a municipality in the state of Santa Catarina in the South region of Brazil.

See also
 List of municipalities in Santa Catarina
 Tangara (disambiguation)

References

Municipalities in Santa Catarina (state)